Cliff dwellers may refer to:

Cliff Dwellers (painting), a 1913 painting by George Bellows
The Cliff Dwellers Club of Chicago, an arts organization founded in 1907
North American tribes who practice cliff dwelling